Gurteen railway station was on the Cork and Muskerry Light Railway in County Cork, Ireland.

History

The station opened on 19 March 1888.

Passenger services were withdrawn on 31 December 1934.

Routes

Further reading

References

Disused railway stations in County Cork
Railway stations opened in 1888
Railway stations closed in 1934